Historical Review may refer to:

 Historical Review (Istorijski Časopis), published by the Institute of History Belgrade
 Historical Review, published by the National Hellenic Research Foundation
 Historical Review Press, a Holocaust-denial publishing imprint established by Anthony Hancock

See also
 History Today, formerly History Review, a London-based monthly illustrated history magazine